Bossk are a British heavy metal band formed in Ashford, Kent in 2005. The band released a string of EPs and smaller releases through QnotQ and Eyesofsound until they broke up in 2008. After reuniting in 2012, they released a new single, "Pick Up Artist" (2013), and their debut studio album, Audio Noir (2016).  They are named after a minor alien character in ‘’The Empire Strikes Back’’.

History
Following their 2006 debut release, .1, on the QnotQ label they toured extensively with a number of bands, including Cult of Luna, The Ocean, Yndi Halda, Baroness, Capricorns and The Hope Conspiracy.

Bossk .2 was released by Eyesofsound in October 2007. Touring on the back of the release saw the band play shows throughout the UK with Devil Sold His Soul and Ephel Duath, and on continental Europe, with Cult of Luna and Humanfly.

During early 2008, after an extensive jaunt around the UK with Kruger, original members Nick (drums) and Rob (guitar) left Bossk. Replacements were found and Bossk were back on the road with Textures for a brief stint in the Netherlands. In May 2008 the band played their 200th show and their first headline show at the Islington Academy in London.

In October of the same year Bossk broke up. Two final shows were played and the .3 video EP was released, along with a trilogy box-set of all their EPs. In August 2009, a split with Rinoa was released. This featured a soundboard recording of a new song which was to be used on the album the band were working on before they called it a day.

Nick, Rob and Alex formed Eddie Falco in 2011 with members of Battle of Wolf 359 and The Shame.

In February 2012, the band announced plans to record a live BBC Maida Vale session and play two shows at a later date. In 2013, Bossk released the single "Pick Up Artist" through the American indie hardcore punk label Deathwish Inc. Three years later in 2016, Bossk released its debut album titled Audio Noir also released through Deathwish. The band promoted the release with a music video for the track "Kobe".

Members

Current
 Tom Begley – bass
 Nick Corney – drums
 Sam Marsh – vocals
 Alex Hamilton – guitar
 Rob Vaughan – guitar, vocals

Former
 John Simmons – drums
 Andrew Waghorn – guitar

Discography

Studio albums
 Audio Noir (2016)
 Migration (2021)

EPs
 .1 (2006)
 .2 (2007)

Splits and singles
 Bossk / Rinoa (split with Rinoa) (2009, Eyesofsound)
 "Pick Up Artist" / "Albatross" (2013, Deathwish)

Compilations
 .1 / .2 (2008, Garden of Exile)

Video albums
 .3 (2008, Eyesofsound)

Music videos
 "Kobe" (2016)
 "Menhir" (2021)

References

English heavy metal musical groups
Musical groups disestablished in 2008
Musical groups established in 2005
Post-metal musical groups
American sludge metal musical groups
Deathwish Inc. artists